The 1989 All-Big Ten Conference football team consists of American football players chosen as All-Big Ten Conference players for the 1989 NCAA Division I-A football season.

Offensive selections

Quarterbacks
 Jeff George, Illinois (AP-1; UPI-1)
 Michael Taylor, Michigan (AP-2)
 Greg Frey, Ohio State (UPI-2)

Running backs
 Anthony Thompson, Indiana (AP-1; UPI-1)
 Tony Boles, Michigan (AP-1; UPI-1)
 Darrell Thompson, Minnesota (AP-2; UPI-2)
 Rob Christian, Northwestern (AP-2)
 Blake Ezor, Michigan State (UPI-2)

Receivers
 Richard Buchanan, Northwestern (AP-1; UPI-2)
 Courtney Hawkins, Michigan State (AP-1; UPI-2)
 Greg McMurtry, Michigan (AP-2; UPI-1)
 Mike Bellamy, Illinois (AP-2; UPI-1)

Tight ends
 Derrick Walker, Michigan (AP-1; UPI-1)
 Duane Young, Michigan State (AP-2)
 Frank Hartley, Illinois (UPI-2)

Centers
 Curt Lovelace, Illinois (AP-1)
 Ron Vargo, Indiana (AP-2; UPI-1)
 Dan Beatty, Ohio State (UPI-2)

Guards
 Dean Dingman, Michigan (AP-1; UPI-1)
 Jeff Davidson, Ohio State (AP-1)
 Ian Beckles, Indiana (AP-2; UPI-1)
 Bill Anderson, Iowa (AP-2)
 Eric Moten, Michigan State (UPI-2)
 Jeff Davidson, Ohio State (UPI-2)

Tackles
 Bob Kula, Michigan State (AP-1; UPI-1)
 Joe Staysniak, Ohio State (AP-1; UPI-1)
 Greg Skrepenak, Michigan (AP-2; UPI-2)
 Todd Oberdorf, Illinois (AP-2)
 Dan Liimata, Minnesota (UPI-2)

Defensive selections

Linemen/outside linebackers
 Mel Agee, Illinois (AP-1; UPI-1)
 Travis Davis, Michigan State (AP-1; UPI-1)
 Moe Gardner, Illinois (AP-1; UPI-1)
 Jim Johnson, Iowa (AP-1; UPI-1)
 Bobby Abrams, Michigan (AP-2)
 Matt Ruhland, Iowa (AP-2)
 Mike Sunvold, Minnesota (AP-2; UPI-2)
 Chris Hutchinson (AP-2)
 Mike Teeter, Michigan (UPI-2)
 Alonzo Spellman, Ohio State (UPI-2)
 Jeff Koeppel, Iowa (UPI-2)

Linebackers
 Darrick Brownlow, Illinois (AP-1; UPI-1)
 Brad Quast, Iowa (AP-1; UPI-1)
 Percy Snow, Michigan State (AP-1; UPI-1)
 Erick Anderson, Michigan (AP-2; UPI-2)
 J. J. Grant, Michigan (AP-2; UPI-2)
 Darrin Trieb, Purdue (AP-2; UPI-2)

Defensive backs
 Harlon Barnett, Michigan State (AP-1; UPI-1)
 Henry Jones, Illinois (AP-1; UPI-1)
 Tripp Welborne, Michigan (AP-1; UPI-1)
 Mike Dumas, Indiana (AP-1; UPI-2)
 Marlon Primous, Illinois (AP-2; UPI-1)
 Vada Murray, Michigan (AP-2; UPI-2)
 Chris Green, Illinois (AP-2)
 Merton Hanks, Iowa (AP-2)
 Zack Dumas, Ohio State (UPI-2)
 Derrick Kelson, Purdue (UPI-2)

Special teams

Kickers
 J. D. Carlson, Michigan (AP-1; UPI-1)
 Brent Berglund, Minnesota (AP-2)
 John Langeloh, Michigan State (UPI-2)

Punters
 Shawn McCarthy, Purdue (AP-1; UPI-1)
 Josh Butland, Michigan State (AP-2; UPI-2)

Other awards
 Most Valuable Player: Anthony Thompson, running back, Indiana (AP)
 Freshman of the Year: Eric Hunter, quarterback, Purdue (AP)

Key
AP = Associated Press

UPI = United Press International

Bold = Consensus first-team selection of both the AP and UPI

See also
1989 College Football All-America Team

References

All-Big Ten Conference
All-Big Ten Conference football teams